Adam Scott Jones (born 9 August 1980, in Birmingham) is an English auto racing driver.

Early career
He competed successfully in Formula 3 and Formula Renault in France, before switching to GT racing. Three years of irregular drives in both the FIA and British GT championships where followed by a stint in the Le Mans Endurance series alongside Sascha Maassen, winning his class at the Nürburgring. In 2005 he raced historic cars as well as the Britcar 24-hour race at Silverstone, in which he finished 3rd alongside Tim Harvey.

Touring Cars

He moved to the British Touring Car Championship for 2006 driving a Lexus IS200 for Xero Competition. His only point came in round 6 of the season at Donington Park.

Adam contested 7 meetings of the 2007 British Touring Car Championship season in a SEAT Toledo Cupra prepared by GR Asia, in the car also used by Tom Coronel in the World Touring Car Championship. He was competitive in the first round but missed the next three meetings, before being among the frontrunners in round 5. In round 6 at Donington Park he qualified 7th, before charging through the field in the first race to finish 2nd for his first BTCC podium , and the first ever for a non-works SEAT. At Brands Hatch the team also ran Gavin Smith in a newer SEAT León, but Jones had the better of him, finishing 7th race one before running 2nd in race two. Contact with Colin Turkington dropped him to 6th, but the reverse grid gave him pole for race 3. He made a poor start before a long-running battle with Tom Onslow-Cole, which ended in a big collision eliminating Jones.

The team ran a SEAT León full-time in 2008 and Jones took a third and a fourth in round 2 at Rockingham, and another podium in round 5 at Croft. In the Independents Trophy he has been among the first 3 finishers in 11 of those 15 races, giving him the class lead – aided by many races having intermediate wet-dry conditions which did not suit the BMWs of his leading rivals Turkington and Mat Jackson. His season ended with a lucky escape at Brands Hatch, as his car speared off the track at Clearways, narrowly missing armco posts which had been bent by a huge crash involving John George earlier in the race. There is every chance that the car could have been launched onto the marshal's post or even into the crowd had he struck these. He ultimately finished 3rd in the class and 9th overall.

For 2009, Jones moved to the all-new Clyde Valley Racing team, alongside the returning Dan Eaves and continued to drive a León. The team failed to complete the season due to lack of funds.

For 2010 Adam competed in the European Abarth Trofeo Championship as a privateer finishing 2nd overall missing out by just a couple of points.

In 2011 Adam competed in the Britcar 24hr in a Seat Leon Supa Copa & also competing in the championship for 2012 gaining 3 pole positions & 2 wins with car owner & team mate Craig Davies.

His next race is the Historic Spa 6hrs competing in a Corvette again with car owner Craig Davies.

Racing record

Complete British Touring Car Championship results
(key) (Races in bold indicate pole position – 1 point awarded just in first race) (Races in italics indicate fastest lap – 1 point awarded all races) (* signifies that driver lead race for at least one lap – 1 point awarded all races)

Complete British GT results
(key) (Races in bold indicate pole position) (Races in italics indicate fastest lap)

External links
Adam Jones
Profile from btcc.net
Profile at BTCCPages.com

1980 births
English racing drivers
Formule Campus Renault Elf drivers
British Formula Renault 2.0 drivers
British Touring Car Championship drivers
FIA GT Championship drivers
Living people
British GT Championship drivers
European Le Mans Series drivers
24 Hours of Spa drivers
British Formula Three Championship drivers
Britcar 24-hour drivers
24H Series drivers
La Filière drivers